Key Denson Pittman (September 19, 1872 – November 10, 1940) was a United States senator from Nevada and a member of the Democratic Party, serving eventually as president pro tempore as well as chairman of the Foreign Relations Committee.

Biography

Early years
Pittman was born in Vicksburg, Mississippi on September 12, 1872, a son of William Buckner Pittman and Katherine Key Pittman. His siblings included a younger brother Vail, who served as Governor of Nevada.

Pittman was educated by private tutors and at the Southwestern Presbyterian University in Clarksville, Tennessee. He studied law, then later became a lawyer. In 1897, Pittman joined in the Klondike Gold Rush and worked as a miner until 1901.

Pittman moved to Tonopah, Nevada, in 1902 and continued the practice of law. He represented Nevada at the St. Louis Exposition, the Lewis and Clark Centennial Exposition, and the National Irrigation Congress.

Political career

In 1910, he made an unsuccessful run for the Senate. Later, he was elected as a Democrat to the Senate in 1913 to fill the vacancy caused by the death of George S. Nixon, and served until his own death in 1940.

Between 1933 and 1940, during the Presidency of Franklin D. Roosevelt, Pittman was the chairman of the powerful Committee on Foreign Relations and a member of the Committee on Territories and the Committee on Industrial Expositions. In addition, during those years Pittman was also President pro tempore of the United States Senate.

Among his legislation is the Pittman–Robertson Wildlife Restoration Act of 1937, which set up a formula for federal sharing of ammunition tax revenue for establishing state wildlife areas.  The program is still in effect. The Key Pittman Wildlife Management Area near Hiko, Nevada, which encompasses the Frenchy and Nesbitt Lakes, is named in his honor.

Death and legacy
It was falsely rumored for years that Pittman died before his final election in 1940, and that Democratic party leaders kept the body at Tonopah's Mizpah Hotel in a bathtub full of ice until after he was reelected so Governor Edward Carville, a fellow Democrat, could appoint a replacement. The truth was, former Nevada State Archivist Guy Rocha wrote, "just as disreputable." Pittman suffered a severe heart attack just before the election on November 5, and two doctors told his aides before the election that death was imminent. To avoid affecting the election, the party told the press that the senator was hospitalized for exhaustion and that his condition was not serious. Pittman died on November 10 at the Washoe General Hospital in Reno, Nevada.

Several pieces of legislation bore his name, including the Pittman Act of 1918 and the Pittman–Robertson Federal Aid in Wildlife Restoration Act of 1937.

The Pittman section of the Alaska Railroad, more commonly known today as the community of Meadow Lakes west of Wasilla, was also named for him.  Pittman Road runs north from its intersection with the George Parks Highway at "downtown" Meadow Lakes.

In 1941, his wife donated Pittman's papers to the Library of Congress. She temporarily withdrew them in 1942. They were returned to the Library by the Gates family in 1954.

See also
 List of United States Congress members who died in office (1900–1949)

Footnotes

Further reading

External links

 The Key Pittman papers, including a finding aid, at the Library of Congress
 
 
 

|-

|-

|-

|-

|-

|-

1872 births
1940 deaths
Democratic Party United States senators from Nevada
Nevada Democrats
Nevada lawyers
People from Tonopah, Nevada
People of the Klondike Gold Rush
Politicians from Vicksburg, Mississippi
Presidents pro tempore of the United States Senate
Chairmen of the Senate Committee on Foreign Relations